Spilve Airport (also given as Rīgas Centrālā lidosta – Riga Central Airport) is a former civilian and military airport in Latvia located 5 km north of Riga's city centre, from which aircraft took off as early as the First World War. It became the first international airport of Riga in the 1920s and fell into disuse in the 1980s after Riga International Airport was built.

History 
Spilve Airport was first used as early as World War I. In 1922-1926 Latvijas Gaisa Satiksmes Akciju Sabiedriba operated flights on Berlin – Königsberg – Kaunas (or Klaipėda / Mėmel) – Riga line. From 1928, regular commercial flights of German-Soviet Deruluft linked Spilve with Berlin via Königsberg, Moscow via Smolensk and Leningrad via Tallinn. From 1932 Polish LOT connected Spilve to Warsaw via Vilnius and to Helsinki via Tallinn. In 1936 German Lufthansa started flights Berlin-Königsberg-Kaunas-Riga-Tallinn-Helsinki. In 1937 Swedish Aerotransport (A.B.A.) and Soviet Aeroflot started a route Stockholm-Riga-Velikiye Luki-Moscow. In 1937-1940 Latvian Valsts gaisa satiksme had regular flights from Spilve to Liepāja.

After World War II and the Soviet occupation, it was rebuilt as the hub for Aeroflot. A new ring taxiway was added and the tarmac changed. The terminal building completed in 1954, still remains as a notable example of Stalin's neoclassical architecture. This building was completely renovated in 2012 and will host Latvian Aviation Museum. The airfield was closed for regular flights in the late 1980s.

A large technical school existed here until the 1990s with one of each major Soviet aircraft type, including Ilyushin Il-18, Ilyushin Il-62 and Tupolev Tu-134, most broken up around 1996 or 1997.

Current use 
The airfield at Spilve is now published in the Latvian pilot's guide "VFR Guide Latvia".  A new (third) hangar has now been built housing up to 5 aircraft (ultralights and aerobatic aircraft) complementing the two existing hangar buildings.  The larger hangar seen on satellite imagery being used to house up to 12 aircraft ranging from ultralight to Cessna 210, while a second hangar to the north east is used for ultralights and flex-wing microlights. Spilve Airport Museum is currently closed.

Riga Spilve is being increasingly used as a base for training private pilots.

The terminal building is currently being turned into the Latvian Aviation Museum.

Transportation 
Public transportation is available. From Stockmann take bus No.3  going in the direction of Bolderāja. Exit at Māju celtniecības kombināts stop.

See also 
 Riga Aviation Museum
 List of aviation museums

References

External links
 An amateur's page about Spilve airfield
  A bit of history and pictures about Spilve

Airports in Riga
Defunct airports
1920s establishments in Latvia